The Singles 81→85 is a greatest hits album by English electronic music band Depeche Mode, released on 14 October 1985 by Mute Records. The compilation was not originally released in North America, where it was replaced by its counterpart Catching Up with Depeche Mode. This was the first release to feature a picture of the band on the cover (aside from the compilation album People Are People, which was released exclusively in North America in 1984).

In 1998, to coincide with the release of The Singles 86>98, the album was reissued and remastered under the title The Singles 81>85, featuring new cover art, two previously omitted tracks and two bonus tracks. As of April 2006, the 1998 reissue had sold 283,000 copies in the United States.

Artwork
On the inner sleeve of both the original LP and the reissue, as well as in the CD booklet and cassette inlay, each single's cover is pictured along with comments by certain reviewers, both positive and negative. Pre-Pet Shop Boys era, Neil Tennant's dismissive Smash Hits review from the actual release date of the double A-side single "Blasphemous Rumours"/"Somebody" is featured.

The photograph by Eric Watson featured on the cover was displayed at the National Portrait Gallery in London.

Track listing
All tracks written by Martin L. Gore, except where noted. All tracks produced by Daniel Miller and Depeche Mode, except where noted.

LP

CD

Charts

Weekly charts

Year-end charts

Certifications

References

External links
 Album information from the official Depeche Mode website
 Remastered album information from the official Depeche Mode website

1985 greatest hits albums
Albums produced by Daniel Miller (music producer)
Albums produced by Gareth Jones (music producer)
Depeche Mode compilation albums
Mute Records compilation albums